The 1965 AFC Youth Championship was held in Tokyo, Japan.  Israel defeated Burma to clinch the title.

Participants

Tournament

Group stage

Group A

Group B

Knockout stages

Semi-finals

Third Place Play Off

Finals

Winners

References 
Jönsson, Mikael, "AFC U-19 Championship 1965". RSSSF

Youth
1965
1965
AFC
AFC
1965 in youth association football
1965 in Tokyo
April 1965 sports events in Asia
May 1965 sports events in Asia